Universal Channel was a Polish pay-tv-channel owned by NBCUniversal. It was available on the platforms n, Cyfra+, Cyfrowy Polsat and cable networks UPC Polska, Multimedia Polska, Digital Vectra and Toya. After the merger of n and CYFRA+ to nc+ the channel was removed from the offer of the new platform. On March 12, 2014 it returned to nc+ again.

NBCUniversal announced on 6 June 2017 that the channel's closure on 1 September 2017 is "part of a strategic rebalance of its channels’ portfolio in the market".

Programming

Arrow
A Touch of Frost
Californication
Castle
CSI: Miami
Dexter
Futurama
Hawaii Five-0
Law & Order
Monk
Psych
Royal Pains
Scandal
Sleeper Cell
Stargate Universe
The Sopranos

References

External links
 

Defunct television channels in Poland
Television channels and stations established in 2007
Television channels and stations disestablished in 2017
Universal Networks International